Sharon Township may refer to:

Illinois 
 Sharon Township, Fayette County, Illinois

Iowa
 Sharon Township, Appanoose County, Iowa
 Sharon Township, Audubon County, Iowa
 Sharon Township, Clinton County, Iowa
 Sharon Township, Johnson County, Iowa

Kansas 
 Sharon Township, Barber County, Kansas

Michigan 
 Sharon Township, Michigan

Minnesota 
 Sharon Township, Le Sueur County, Minnesota

Nebraska 
 Sharon Township, Buffalo County, Nebraska

North Dakota 
 Sharon Township, Steele County, North Dakota

Ohio
 Sharon Township, Franklin County, Ohio 
 Sharon Township, Medina County, Ohio
 Sharon Township, Noble County, Ohio
 Sharon Township, Richland County, Ohio

Pennsylvania 
 Sharon Township, Potter County, Pennsylvania

South Dakota 
 Sharon Township, Hutchinson County, South Dakota

See also 
Sharon (disambiguation)

Township name disambiguation pages